"Heart of the Country" is a song written by Paul and Linda McCartney from their album Ram released in 1971.

Origins
The song has simple acoustic tune with a heavy bass chorus, and an unusually mellow sound to the acoustic guitar that was achieved by tuning all of the strings a full step lower than standard pitch.  The song is about a man searching for a farm in the middle of nowhere. 
The song reflects Paul's heading for the Scottish countryside to escape the headaches associated with the Beatles' break-up at the time.

Composition
The song is played in the key of D Minor at a tempo of 172.

Personnel
Paul McCartney – lead vocals, bass guitar, guitar
Linda McCartney – backing vocals
Hugh McCracken – guitar
Denny Seiwell – drums (with brushes)

Reception
In a contemporary review for Ram, Jon Landau of Rolling Stone gave "Heart of the Country" a negative review, calling it the album's "lowest point", and the song that "most clearly indicates [Ram'''s] failures". Landau described the song as "an evenly paced, finger-picking styled tune, with very light jazz overtones, obviously intended as Paul's idea of "mellow."". However, Landau believed McCartney's lyrics about the country "ring false".

Stephen Thomas Erlewine of AllMusic described the song as "an effortless folk-pop tune that ranks among [McCartney's] very best songs". Erlewine also praises its "imaginative and gorgeous arrangement". In 2013, Rolling Stone rated "Heart of the Country" at number 26 in its list of Paul McCartney's best post-Beatles songs.

Aftermath
McCartney and Elvis Costello re-recorded the song, with Mark Ronson producing, in 2013 for a commercial featuring his late wife Linda's vegetarian recipe book.

It was also included on The 7" Singles Box'' in 2022.

References

Paul McCartney songs
Songs written by Paul McCartney
1970 songs
Songs written by Linda McCartney
Song recordings produced by Paul McCartney
Music published by MPL Music Publishing